The 1980 James Madison Dukes football team was an American football team that represented James Madison University during the 1980 NCAA Division I-AA football season as an independent. In their ninth year under head coach Challace McMillin, the team compiled a 4–6 record.

Schedule

References

James Madison
James Madison Dukes football seasons
James Madison Dukes football